The Northeast Iowa Conference (NEIC) is a six school athletic conference made up of mid-sized schools in the Northeast Corner of Iowa. The conference dates in 1920, making it one of Iowa's oldest existing athletic conferences.

Members

Departing members highlighted in red.

Waverly-Shell Rock will be removed from the NEIC as of June 30, 2023, due to an imbalance of enrollment when compared to the other members. Likely landing spots for the school include the Iowa Alliance Conference or the Mississippi Valley Conference

Invited Members
The following school districts were invited to the NEIC on April 25 for the 2023-24 school year. No school district has yet announced its intentions.

Oelwein and Osage were formerly charter members. Osage left the conference in 1958, Oelwein in 2021

History
The NEIC was founded in 1920 by seven schools in northeastern Iowa. These seven schools were Charles City, Cresco, Decorah, New Hampton, Oelwein, Osage, and Waverly. All of the schools were located in some of the largest cities in Northeastern Iowa and most were located in their respective county seats. Cedar Falls joined the league in or around 1948, pushing membership to eight. By the early-1960s, Osage and Cedar Falls had left the conference to join a more local and a larger conference, respectively. Cresco also merged with other small area schools to become Crestwood High School around this time, while the small Shell Rock district joined Waverly. The membership of the conference stayed at six for a few years until Allamakee School District in Waukon joined the conference. Membership has been the same since at least 1970. As of 2011, all of the schools are either 3A or 2A by classification, Iowa's second and third largest classes. New Hampton has been a 2A school since 2010, and Waukon moved to class 2A in 2012. 2021-22, Oelwein left for the NICL leaving the conference with 6 members

External links
 Official site

References

High school sports in Iowa
1920 establishments in Iowa
Sports leagues established in 1920